Lynwood W. Savage (born 1954) is a former member of the Pennsylvania House of Representatives. He represented the 192nd House district in Philadelphia, Pennsylvania.

Savage won the special election to complete the term of Rep. Louise Bishop, who resigned due to corruption charges. He subsequently lost the chance for a full term representing the 192nd district to Morgan Cephas in the 2016 Democratic primary.

References

External links
Official Web Site
PA House profile

Living people
Politicians from Philadelphia
Democratic Party members of the Pennsylvania House of Representatives
African-American state legislators in Pennsylvania
21st-century American politicians
1954 births
21st-century African-American politicians
20th-century African-American people